Callionymus platycephalus, the flathead dragonet, is a species of dragonet endemic to the Pacific waters around the Philippines where it occurs from the surface to .  This species grows to a length of  SL.

References 

P
Fish described in 1983